The Bünting Clover Leaf Map, also known as The World in a Cloverleaf, (German title: "Die ganze Welt in einem Kleberblat/Welches ist der Stadt Hannover meines lieben Vaterlandes Wapen") is a historic mappa mundi drawn by the German Protestant pastor, theologian, and cartographer Heinrich Bünting. The map was published in his book Itinerarium Sacrae Scripturae (Travel Book of Holy Scripture) in 1581. 

Today the map is found within the Eran Laor maps collection in the National Library of Israel in Jerusalem. A mosaic model of the map is installed on the fence of Safra Square at the site of Jerusalem's city hall.

The map is a figurative illustration, in the manner of the medieval mappa mundi format, depicting the world via a clover shape. The shape symbolizes the Christian Trinity and also appears in the coat of arms of Hanover, where Bünting was born. The city of Jerusalem is represented as the centre, surrounded by three central continents, with some more areas of the world being accordingly illustrated separately from the clover.

Description
The dimension of the map is 38 by 30 centimeters.

Jerusalem is in the centre of the map surrounded by the three continents of Europe, Africa, and Asia, comprising three leaves of a clover shape. The top-left leaf shape coloured in red represents Europe, the bottom one coloured in yellow represents Africa, and the top-right one coloured in green represents Asia. The three continents include captions of their various countries and illustrations of some of their cities. Europe includes one illustration of the Italian city Rome, the continent of Africa includes illustrations of three cities with one being the Egyptian city of Alexandria, and Asia includes illustrations of nine cities.

The clover is surrounded by the ocean, with its surface including illustrations of sea creatures, monsters, and a ship. England and Denmark—as perhaps the tip of the entire Nordic countries—are represented as two island-shapes above Europe’s leaf. The Red Sea is illustrated between Africa and Asia, painted in red. America is represented as a separated, mostly unrevealed shape at the lower left corner, coloured in green like Asia, with the caption Die Neue Welt (The New World).

References

Further reading
Jerusalem in Maps and Mirrors, from Byzantine Period Until the 19th Century, 1987, Nahar Books and Kinneret Zmora-Bitan Dvir publishers.

External links
 Information about the map at Eran Laor's Collection, The National Library of Israel website.
 Description of the map – Yale university, Under the title Asia Secunda Pars Terrae in Forma Pegasir. Die Gantze Welt in ein Kleberblat. Heinrich Bunting, c. 1590.

Historic maps of the world
1581 works
16th-century maps and globes